Jamar Hunt (born December 4, 1982) is a former American football tight end for the Dallas Cowboys of the National Football League. He was signed as an undrafted rookie free agent out of UTEP. However, he was waived by the Cowboys on July 2, 2009.

References

External links
 Ex-Cowboy Hunt seeking damages

1982 births
Living people
Players of American football from Arizona
American football tight ends
UTEP Miners football players
Dallas Cowboys players